4-Pyridylnicotinamide (4-PNA), also known as N-(pyridin-4-yl)nicotinamide, is a kinked dipodal dipyridine which was originally developed for use in chemotherapy. As in its isomer 3-pyridylnicotinamide, the nitrogen atoms on its pyridine rings can donate their electron lone pairs to metal cations, allowing it to bridge metal centers and act as a bidentate ligand in coordination polymers.  It is synthesized through the reaction of nicotinoyl chloride and 4-aminopyridine.

References

Chelating agents
Nicotinamides